Rosa Garrido Roberto-Carter Ph.D. (August 29, 1929 – April 11, 2010) was a Guamanian educator who served as the President of the University of Guam from 1977 to 1983.

Carter, the oldest of nine children, was born to Antonia Santos Garrido and Jose Duenas Roberto on 29 August 1929. Under the Japanese occupation of Guam (1941-1944). she and her family survived through World War II, including internment in 1944 in the Manengon concentration camp.

Carter was inducted into the Guam Educator's Hall of Fame though a legislative resolution.

She died at her home in Yona, Guam, at the age of 80.

References

1929 births
2010 deaths
Guamanian educators
Presidents of the University of Guam
Guamanian women
Northern State University alumni
University of Sydney alumni
University of Northern Colorado alumni
Bowling Green State University alumni
20th-century American educators
20th-century American women educators